Jonathan Anderson may refer to:
 Jonathan Anderson (American football) (born 1991), American football player
 Jonathan Anderson (fashion designer) (born 1984), Northern Irish fashion designer

See also
Jon Anderson (disambiguation)